Raunaq Singh Gill (born 20 February 1910, date of death unknown) was an Indian long-distance runner. He competed in the men's 5000 metres at the 1936 Summer Olympics.

References

1910 births
Year of death missing
Athletes (track and field) at the 1936 Summer Olympics
Indian male long-distance runners
Olympic athletes of India
Place of birth missing